Geert van Eijk (born 8 October 1948) is a Dutch field hockey player. He competed in the men's tournament at the 1976 Summer Olympics.

References

External links
 

1948 births
Living people
Dutch male field hockey players
Olympic field hockey players of the Netherlands
Field hockey players at the 1976 Summer Olympics
People from Tegelen
Sportspeople from Limburg (Netherlands)
20th-century Dutch people